Tausengirovo (Tawheñer) is a rural locality (a village) in Shaymuratovsky Selsoviet, Karmaskalinsky District, Bashkortostan, Russia. The population was 72 as of 2010. There are two streets.

Geography 
Tausengirovo is located 7 km southwest of Karmaskaly (the district's administrative centre) by road. Karmaskaly is the nearest rural locality.

References 

Rural localities in Karmaskalinsky District